Alexander "Sasha" Ivanovich Shatravka (born 6 October 1950) is a Russian-born former Soviet dissident and peace activist. He is known for his attempt to escape from the Soviet Union as a 24-year old sailor in 1974 and for spending nine years as a political prisoner in Soviet psychiatric hospitals and Gulag concentration camps, from 1974 to 1979 and from 1982 to 1986. In 1983 he was sentenced to three years in prison for circulating a petition calling for the universal abolition of nuclear weapons, following his release in 1979. He was released in 1986, in time for the changes of glasnost and perestroika. He finally made it to the West, and testified before the Commission on Security and Cooperation in Europe on political abuse of psychiatry in the Soviet Union. He has lived in the United States since 1986 and was naturalized as a U.S. citizen in 1992. His memoir Escape from Paradise was published in Russian in 2010 and in English in 2019.

Bibliography

References

See also
Political abuse of psychiatry in the Soviet Union

1950 births
Living people
Soviet dissidents